Reverse is the debut album from Romanian group Morandi released in 2005. It had big success in Europe. Morandi released their first single, "Love Me", in 2004. It was successful, especially in many clubs of Bucharest.

Track listing 
Credits adapted from the liner notes of Reverse.

Singles
 Love Me
 Beijo

Certifications

See also
List of certified albums in Romania

External links
Morandi – Reverse @ Discogs

References

2005 debut albums
Morandi (band) albums